Roy Orbison Sings is the sixteenth album recorded by Roy Orbison and the ninth for MGM Records, released in May 1972. Around this time, Orbison's hit singles had well and truly dried up, but this album is said to be one of his finest.

History
The album was recorded during various sessions, starting in August 1969, then at various times during 1970 and 1971. Around this time Orbison's former composer Joe Melson returned to Orbison after Melson was writing songs on his own.

Track listing

Side one
"God Love You" (Roy Orbison, Joe Melson) (Arr: Joe Tanner)
"Beaujolais" (John Carter, Tim Gilbert) 
"If Only for a While" (Bill Dees, Larry Henley) (Arr: Jim Hall)
"Rings of Gold" (Gene Thomas) (Arr: Joe Tanner)
"Help Me" (Orbison, Melson) (Arr: Jim Hall)
"Plain Jane Country (Come to Town)" (Eddy Raven)

Side two
"Harlem Woman" (Orbison, Melson) (Arr: Bergen White)
"Cheyenne" (Carter, Gilbert) 
"Changes" (Orbison, Melson) (Arr: Joe Tanner)
"It Takes All Kinds of People" (Orbison, Mike Curb) (Arr: Don Peake)
"Remember the Good" (Mickey Newbury) (Arr: Joe Tanner)

Side One:
Tracks 1, 5 Produced by Joe Melson & Roy Orbison
Track 2 Produced by Don Gant
Tracks 3, 4, 6 Produced by Wesley Rose

Side Two:
Tracks 1, 3 Produced by Joe Melson & Roy Orbison
Track 2 Produced by Don Gant
Track 4 Produced by Mike Curb
Track 5 Produced by Wesley Rose

European Track Listing

Side One
"Changes"
"Harlem Woman"
"Cheyenne"
"Yesterday's Child" (originally appeared on Roy Orbison's Many Moods) (Roy Orbison, Bill Dees)
"It Takes All Kinds of People"
"Beaujolias"

Side Two
"God Love You"
"If Only For a While"
"Help Me" 
"Plain Jane Country (Come to Town)"
"Rings of Gold"
"Remember The Good"
Released on London Records

Roy Orbison albums
1972 albums
Albums produced by Don Gant
Albums produced by Wesley Rose
MGM Records albums
Albums produced by Mike Curb